Ogawamachi Station (小川町駅) is the name of two train stations in Japan:

 Ogawamachi Station (Saitama), a railway station in Ogose, Saitama, Japan, jointly operated by East Japan Railway Company (JR East) and Tobu Railway
 Ogawamachi Station (Tokyo), a train station in Chiyoda, Tokyo, Japan